Gloria Hendry (born March 3, 1949) is an American actress and former model. Hendry is best known for her roles in films from the 1970s, most notably: portraying Rosie Carver in 1973's James Bond film Live and Let Die; and Helen Bradley in the blaxploitation film Black Caesar, and the sequel, Hell Up in Harlem.

Biography

Early life and education
Born in Jacksonville or Winter Haven, Florida (sources differ), Hendry was the older of two daughters. Hendry's family, which consisted of her mother and sister relocated to Newark, New Jersey to live with her grandparents during her early childhood. Hendry studied at Essex College of Business for Law.

Career
Hendry worked as a Playboy Bunny at the New York Playboy Club from 1965 until 1972. In 1968, Hendry received her first acting role in Sidney Poitier's film For Love of Ivy, followed by a small role in the 1970 film The Landlord. In 1973, Hendry portrayed the Bond girl Rosie Carver in the James Bond film Live and Let Die. In that film, she became the first African American woman to become romantically involved with 007; Trina Parks, who played a nemesis to Bond rather than a love interest in Diamonds Are Forever (the previous Bond film) is considered to be the first Black Bond girl.

Hendry later starred in several 1970s blaxploitation films, including Across 110th Street (1972), Slaughter's Big Rip-Off (1973), and both the 1973 films Black Caesar and its sequel Hell Up in Harlem. She also portrayed the martial arts expert, Sydney, in Black Belt Jones (1974), and appeared in Savage Sisters (1974) and Bare Knuckles (1977). Her later films included the horror film Pumpkinhead II: Blood Wings (1994) and the action comedy Freaky Deaky (2012).

Filmography

Film

References

Sources

External links
 
 The Gloria Hendry Interview (about Live and Let Die)
 Gloria Hendry's Fansite (in French)

1949 births
20th-century American actresses
21st-century American actresses
Actresses from Florida
Actresses from New Jersey
African-American actresses
American film actresses
American people of Chinese descent
American people of Irish descent
American people of Muscogee descent
American people of Seminole descent
Living people
People from Winter Haven, Florida